Judge Not is a 1914 Swedish silent drama film directed by Victor Sjöström.

Cast
 Nils Ahrén - Helder
 Greta Almroth - Clara
 Hilda Borgström - Mary
 John Ekman - Albert Smith
 Nils Elffors
 William Larsson - Ruffian
 Richard Lund - Walter Crain
 Jenny Tschernichin-Larsson - Maid

References

External links

1914 films
1910s Swedish-language films
Swedish black-and-white films
1914 drama films
Swedish silent films
Films directed by Victor Sjöström
Swedish drama films
Silent drama films